Major General Matheus Alueendo (born 4 March 1961) is a retired Namibian military officer who served as commander of the Namibian army. He was appointed the commander of the Namibian army on the 31st July 2019 until his retirement 31st December 2022

Career
Alueendo's military career began in 1978 when he joined the People's Liberation Army of Namibia (PLAN) in exile participating in the liberation struggle. In July 1990 he was repatriated to Namibia under the UNTAG programme and began his career in the Namibian Army. After being commissioned as a lieutenant he rose through the ranks.

In 2003 he attended the Senior Command and Staff Course at the Defence Services Staff College in India, a faculty affiliated to Madras University. He also enrolled for the Master of Military Science degree in Defence and Strategic Studies whilst doing his senior staff course and graduated from both programme that year. In 2009 as a lieutenant colonel he completed his second Master's Degree in Strategic and Security Studies (MASSS) from the University of Namibia. In 2010 he was promoted to the rank of colonel and appointed as a senior staff officer in the Defence Intelligence Directorate. During the year 2014 he attended a Advanced Military Diploma Course at the Military Academy of the General Staff of the Armed Forces of Russia in Russia. In 2016 he attended the Advance post graduate military qualification 'ndc' programme at the National Defence College (India) whilst at the same time he also enrolled for the M.Phil. degree in 'Defence and Strategic Studies  at the Madras University completing the 'ndc' programme in 2016 and the M.Phil. programme in 2018. He was promoted to brigadier general in November 2013 and appointed as Chief of Staff Defence Intelligence. In September 2018 he was appointed as the Deputy Namibian Army Commander.

On 31 July 2019 Alueendo was appointed commander of the Namibian Army.

Qualifications
2003: Post graduate military qualification ('psc'), Indian Defence Services Command and Staff Course
2003: Master's of Military Science Degree in Defence and Strategic Studies (MSc) Madras University, India
2009: Master's of Arts in Strategic and Security Studies (MASSS), University of Namibia
2014: Advance Military Diploma, Academy of General Staff, Russia
2016: Advance post graduate military qualification ('ndc') National Defence College (India)
2018: Master's of Philosophy Degree Strategic Studies, Madras University, India

Honours and decorations
  NDF Campaign Medal 
NDF 10 years service medal
  UNMIL Peacekeeping medal
  UNMIL Peacekeeping medal
  Namibian Army Pioneer Medal
  Army Ten Years Service Medal
  Army Twenty Years Service Medal
  NDF Commendation Medal

References

1961 births
Living people
People's Liberation Army of Namibia personnel
Namibian military personnel
National Defence College, India alumni
Defence Services Staff College alumni